Bernard Robert Louis Fraisse (born August 1956) is a French billionaire businessman, the chairman, founder and 100% owner of Fareva, a French  pharmaceutical company, with annual revenues of  $1.4 billion in 2015.

Early life
Fraisse has a degree in mechanical engineering.

Career
Fraisse founded Fareva in 1985, and the company employs 9,500 people in 2018. Fareva is the largest contract manufacturing organization (CMO) in France.

Personal life
Fraisse lives in Paris.

References

1956 births
French billionaires
French businesspeople
Living people